Schwarzbach is a German name meaning "dark stream."

Schwarzbach may refer to:

 Schwarzbach (surname)
 Schwarzbach Railway, a narrow gauge railway in Saxon Switzerland

 rivers:
 Schwarzbach (Große Mittweida), of Saxony, tributary of the Große Mittweida
 Schwarzbach (Sebnitz), of Saxony, Germany, tributary of the Sebnitz
 Schwarzbach (Mulde), of Saxony, Germany, tributary of the Mulde
 Schwarzbach (White Elster), of Saxony, Germany, tributary of the White Elster
 Schwarzbach (Werra), of Thuringia, Germany, tributary of the Werra
 Schwarzbach (Aa), of North Rhine-Westphalia, Germany, right tributary of the Johannisbach, that in the later course is called Westfälische Aa
 Schwarzbach (Bergisches Land), of the Bergisches Land, North Rhine-Westphalia, Germany, tributary of the Rhine
 Schwarzbach (Emscher), of North Rhine-Westphalia, Germany, left tributary of the Emscher
 Schwarzbach (Wupper), of North Rhine-Westphalia, Germany, right tributary of the Wupper
 Schwarzbach (Blies), of Rhineland-Palatinate and Saarland, Germany, tributary of the Blies
 Schwarzbach (Elmbach), of Hesse, Germany, tributary of the Elmbach
 Schwarzbach (Ried), of the Hessian Ried, Hesse, Germany, tributary of the Rhine
 Schwarzbach (Main), of Hesse, Germany, tributary of the Main
 Schwarzbach (Klettgau), of the Canton of Zürich, Switzerland, and of Baden-Württemberg, Germany, tributary of the Klingengraben
 Schwarzbach (Elsenz), of Baden-Württemberg, Germany
 Schwarzbach (Günz), of Bavaria, Germany, tributary of the Günz
 Schwarzbach (Laufach), of Bavaria, Germany, tributary of the Laufach
 Schwarzbach (Saalach), of Bavaria, Germany, tributary of the Saalach
 Schwarzbach (Reschbach), of Bavaria, Germany, tributary of the Reschbach

 municipalities and villages
 Schwarzbach, Brandenburg, in the Oberspreewald-Lausitz district, Brandenburg, Germany
 Schwarzbach (Elterlein), in the Ore Mountains in Saxony, Germany, today part of the town Elterlein
 Schwarzbach, Thuringia, in the district of Greiz, Thuringia, Germany
 Černá v Pošumaví, a village in South Bohemia, Czech Republic, known as Schwarzbach in German

See also 
 Schwarzenbach (disambiguation)